Dystasia tonkinea is a species of beetle in the family Cerambycidae. It was described by Maurice Pic in 1930.

References

Pteropliini
Beetles described in 1930